Do Hanso Ka Joda is a 1992 Bollywood film directed by Anup Malik.

Cast
Anupam (Actor)
 Kanchan (Actress)
Kiran Kumar (Actor)
Pran (Actor)
 Reema Lagoo (Actress)
 Beena Banarjee (Actress)
 Sulbha Deshpande (Actress)
 Mohan Kumar (Actor)
 Ajit Vachanni  (Actor)

Music
"Hum Aur Tum" - Sudesh Bhosle, Anupama Deshpande
"Dushman Dilo Ka Jala" - Kumar Sanu
"Tujh Bin Raha Na Jaye" - Mohammed Aziz

External links
 

1990s Hindi-language films